Marcelo Vilar e Lima Lopes (born 13 May 1961) is a Brazilian football manager, currently in charge of Icasa.

Honours

Manager
Ceará
 Campeonato Cearense: 1997

Itapipoca
 Campeonato Cearense Segunda Divisão: 1998

Roma Barueri
 Copa São Paulo de Futebol Júnior: 2001

Treze
 Campeonato Paraibano: 2011, 2012

Botafogo-PB
 Campeonato Brasileiro Série D: 2013
 Campeonato Paraibano: 2013, 2014

Ferroviário-CE
 Campeonato Brasileiro Série D: 2018
 Copa Fares Lopes: 2018

São Caetano
 Copa Paulista: 2019

References

External links
 

1961 births
Living people
Sportspeople from Fortaleza
Brazilian football managers
Campeonato Brasileiro Série A managers
Campeonato Brasileiro Série C managers
Campeonato Brasileiro Série D managers
Ceará Sporting Club managers
Fortaleza Esporte Clube managers
Ferroviário Atlético Clube (CE) managers
FC Atlético Cearense managers
Associação Desportiva Recreativa e Cultural Icasa managers
Sociedade Esportiva Palmeiras managers
Grêmio Barueri Futebol managers
Central Sport Club managers
Treze Futebol Clube managers
América Futebol Clube (RN) managers
Mixto Esporte Clube managers
Botafogo Futebol Clube (PB) managers
Sociedade Esportiva e Recreativa Caxias do Sul managers
Moto Club de São Luís managers
Club Sportivo Sergipe managers
Agremiação Sportiva Arapiraquense managers
Associação Desportiva São Caetano managers
Associação Ferroviária de Esportes managers
Ríver Atlético Clube managers
Associação Atlética de Altos managers